Gender quota may refer to:
 
 
 
 
 Father's quota, for paternity leave in Norway

See also
 Sexism